Bridewell Theatre is a small theatre based in Blackfriars in London. It is operated as part of the St Bride Foundation Institute, named after nearby St Bride's Church on Fleet Street.

It specialises in 'Lunchbox' theatre which last for 45 minutes. It also organises concerts.

The theatre is used by a number of London Amateur Dramatic Societies, including Centre Stage London. In November 2022, the society staged Roger and Hammerstein's Cinderella.

References

External links
 Bridewell Theatre

Pub theatres in London
Pub theatres in England